Loot is a 1970 British comedy film directed by Silvio Narizzano. It is based on the play of the same name by Joe Orton and stars Richard Attenborough, Lee Remick, Hywel Bennett, Milo O'Shea and Roy Holder. It was entered into the 1971 Cannes Film Festival.

Plot
The setting is a seaside hotel owned by a Mr. McLeavy in the 1960s in England. The owner’s son, Hal (Roy Holder), and Hal's boyfriend, Dennis (Hywel Bennett), rob a bank located next to the funeral parlour where Dennis works. They hide the money in the coffin of Hal’s mother, who has just died and whose body has been returned to the hotel prior to its final burial.

Inspector Truscott (Richard Attenborough) investigates the bank robbery and immediately suspects Hal and Dennis. Meanwhile, Mr. McLeavy (Milo O'Shea) is being aggressively courted by Fay McMahon (Lee Remick), the nurse who cared for Hal’s ailing mother in her last weeks of life. Fay is having an affair with Dennis, but she has no real interest in him until he tells her he has come into money. Inspector Truscott also has a particular interest in Nurse McMahon, he is sure she murdered several of her former husbands, and also thinks she poisoned Hal's mother.

Truscott's investigations, and Dennis and Hal’s ongoing measures to get away with the proceeds of the bank robbery, make up the action in Loot.

Cast
 Richard Attenborough as Inspector Truscott
 Lee Remick as Nurse Fay McMahon
 Hywel Bennett as Dennis
 Milo O'Shea as Mr. McLeavy
 Roy Holder as Hal
 Dick Emery as Mr. Bateman
 Joe Lynch as Father O'Shaughnessy
 John Cater as Meadows
 Aubrey Woods as Undertaker
 Enid Lowe as W.V.A. Leader
 Harold Innocent as Bank Manager
 Kevin Brennan as Vicar
 Andonia Katsaros as Policewoman
 Jean Marlow as Mrs. McLeavy
 Robert Raglan as Doctor
 Hal Galili as Pallbearer
 Douglas Ridley as Pallbearer
 Stephen Yardley as Pallbearer
 Edwin Finn as Pallbearer

Reception
In The Daily Telegraph in 2017, Tim Robey wrote "it retains something of the spirit of 1960s caper movies, such as Gambit (1966) and The Italian Job (1969). The queer sensibility of the play – censored for blasphemy and gay references in its time – is tentatively rather than fully explored – Georgy Girl director Silvio Narizzano opted to play it all for broad, primary-coloured farce."

According to the screenwriters seeking to turn the play into a film (Ray Galton and Alan Simpson), in 2012 Orton's agent Peggy Ramsay was complimentary, "... even she couldn't tell where he'd finished and where we started. But it's not a great film, unfortunately". Part of this was because, to the writers' regret, Narizzano directed the actors to perform "in an over-the-top style, and it doesn't work".

The film was approved by Sidney Gilliat who was on the board of British Lion. He later admitted this was a mistake as the film lost a lot of money.

References

External links
 
 

1970 films
1970 comedy films
1970s crime comedy films
1970s heist films
1970 LGBT-related films
British crime comedy films
British films based on plays
British heist films
British LGBT-related films
Films directed by Silvio Narizzano
Films set in Brighton
Funeral homes in fiction
Films shot in East Sussex
1970s English-language films
1970s British films